The men's elimination race competition at the 2020  UEC European Track Championships was held on 11 November 2020.

Results

References

Men's elimination race
European Track Championships – Men's elimination race